Burgeff is a surname. Notable people with the surname include:

 Hans Edmund Nicola Burgeff (1883–1976), German botanist, father of Hans Karl
 Hans Karl Burgeff (1928–2005), German sculptor, medal engraver, and art lecturer